Ruma is a village in Randolph County, Illinois, United States. The population was 317 at the 2010 census.

Geography
Ruma is located at  (38.133512, -89.998497).

Demographics

As of the census of 2000, there were 260 people, 99 households, and 69 families residing in the village. The racial makeup of the village was 98.85% White and 1.15% Asian.

There were 99 households, out of which 40.4% had children under the age of 18 living with them, 59.6% were married couples living together, 6.1% had a female householder with no husband present, and 29.3% were non-families. 26.3% of all households were made up of individuals, and 11.1% had someone living alone who was 65 years of age or older. The average household size was 2.63 and the average family size was 3.20.

In the village, the population was spread out, with 31.5% under the age of 18, 8.1% from 18 to 24, 32.3% from 25 to 44, 18.1% from 45 to 64, and 10.0% who were 65 years of age or older. The median age was 33 years. For every 100 females, there were 103.1 males. For every 100 females age 18 and over, there were 100.0 males.

The median income for a household in the village was $33,929, and the median income for a family was $38,333. Males had a median income of $31,346 versus $21,250 for females. The per capita income for the village was $16,176. About 13.2% of families and 13.6% of the population were below the poverty line, including 20.0% of those under the age of eighteen and none of those 65 or over.

References

External links
Randolph County Herald Tribune, local newspaper

Villages in Randolph County, Illinois
Villages in Illinois

pt:Ruma